Harkesh Nagar Okhla is a Delhi Metro station in Delhi. It is located between Govindpuri and Jasola Apollo stations on the Violet Line. The station was opened with the first section of the Line on 3 October 2010 in time for the Commonwealth Games opening ceremony on the same day. It was earlier known as Okhla, and was renamed in December 2014.It serves Harkesh Nagar, Shyam Nagar, Okhla Phase II and IIIT Delhi.

The station

Station layout

Facilities
List of available ATM at Harkesh Nagar Okhla metro station are HDFC Bank

Entry/Exit

Connections

Bus

See also

Delhi
Govindpuri
List of Delhi Metro stations
Transport in Delhi
Delhi Metro Rail Corporation
Delhi Suburban Railway
Delhi Monorail
Delhi Transport Corporation
South East Delhi
New Delhi
National Capital Region (India)
List of rapid transit systems
List of metro systems

References

External links

 Delhi Metro Rail Corporation Ltd. (Official site) 
 Delhi Metro Annual Reports
 
 UrbanRail.Net – Descriptions of all metro systems in the world, each with a schematic map showing all stations.

Delhi Metro stations
Railway stations opened in 2010
Railway stations in South Delhi district

hi:ओखला